Yap Ling (born 1 April 2000) is a Malaysian badminton player. She was part of the Malaysian squad that won a bronze medal in the 2021 Sudirman Cup. She also participated in the 2020 Thomas & Uber Cup.

Career 
In 2017, Yap represented Malaysia as a team member and won the bronze and silver medal in the mixed team events of the Badminton Asia Junior Championships and the BWF World Junior Championships respectively. At the 2018 Badminton Asia Junior Championships, she won the bronze medal in the mixed team event. Yap was then transferred from the Bukit Jalil Sports School (youth team) to the national team.

She partnered with Go Pei Kee and were semifinalists at the 2021 Czech Open. They participated in the 2021 Southeast Asian Games.

Achievements

BWF International Challenge/Series (1 runner-up) 
Women's doubles

  BWF International Challenge tournament
  BWF International Series tournament
  BWF Future Series tournament

References

External links 
 

2000 births
Living people
People from Malacca
Malaysian sportspeople of Chinese descent
Malaysian female badminton players
Competitors at the 2021 Southeast Asian Games
Southeast Asian Games competitors for Malaysia